Nyhedsavisen was a Danish free daily newspaper based on a new concept of distributing a free newspaper to 500,000 Danish homes that became the most read in the country within 18 month of launch. It was owned by investment and advisory catalyst LundXY.

History and profile
Nyhedsavisen was first published on 6 October 2006. In its first year the paper had a circulation of 160,000 copies. In March 2007 its circulation was 400,000 copies.

At its inception, the paper was owned by the Icelandic Baugur Group, with minority stakes held by a number of co-founders, including Morten Lund. However, in January 2008, Baugur decided to sell Lund a 51% majority share of Dagsbrun Media, the holding company for the newspaper. For the acquisition, Lund had teamed up with Morten Wagner of Freeway, an owner of popular social networking sites such as dating.dk and arto.dk. It is believed that they bought the stake for a single Danish crown. At that stage, the newspaper had lost close to $50 million. Rumour has it that Morten Lund assumed this debt.

Detractors pointed out that Nyhedsavisen suffered with funding issues from the outset; at launch, analysts were concerned that Baugur's £45m investment was too small to keep it afloat. It was also reported in the Danish press that the newspaper lost 200m Danish crowns over the course of 2007, before Lund's takeover. However, under new ownership it officially claimed the position of most widely read newspaper in Denmark, with a daily circulation of 551,000 copies and A-Pressen have taken over the news paper's on-line edition.

The paper was closed in August 2008 with a reported deficit of approximately $100 million, generated mostly under the previous ownership, making it the latest victim of the so-called "newspaper wars" in Denmark.

Editorial
The editorial management presented Nyhedsavisen as a new journalistic concept because of its special mix of news stories. The mix was meant to make the news paper a contrast to the established newspapers.

According to the editorial management at Nyhedsavisen the old news papers were too reactionary, because they published too many stories based on the political system. Nyhedsavisen categorized these stories as the World of power.

The idea was to downgrade these type of stories. Instead the news paper should contain much more stores from what Nyhedsavisen named The unknown World and Our world. These two categories respectively contained stories about for instance new science and family life.

The competing newspapers that Nyhedsavisen criticized has denied that Nyhedsavisen contributed with a new type of newspaper.

See also
 24timer
 Dato (newspaper)
 MetroXpress
 Urban (newspaper)

References

External links
 Official website 

2006 establishments in Denmark
2008 disestablishments in Denmark
Publications established in 2006
Publications disestablished in 2008
Danish-language newspapers
Defunct free daily newspapers
Defunct newspapers published in Denmark
Newspapers published in Copenhagen
Daily newspapers published in Denmark